La Antilla is a beach resort within the municipality of Lepe, in the province of Huelva, a part of the autonomous region of Andalusia, Spain.  It has between three and four thousand year-round residents, but its population increases to about 70,000 in the summer.  Frequented mainly by Spanish vacationers, it is known for its clean waters and peaceful atmosphere.  It also has a 24-hole golf course.  A few kilometers away, also on the Costa de la Luz, is its "twin" beach town, Islantilla.

Populated places in the Province of Huelva